HNLMS Gouden Leeuw was a Prins van Oranje-class minelayer of the Royal Netherlands Navy built by N.V. Internationale Scheepsbouw Mij. 'De Maas'. She was designed for service in the Dutch East Indies. She was scuttled during World War II by her own crew.

Construction
Gouden Leeuw was laid down on 23 September 1930. She was launched on 9 September 1931 and commissioned on 24 February 1932.

Service history
On 8 December 1932 Gouden Leeuw left the Netherlands for the Dutch East Indies, where she arrived on 27 January 1933 in Sabang.

In the period of September 1939 until January 1942 Gouden Leeuw laid minefields near Balikpapan, Tarakan and Surabaja.

In January and February 1942 she was part of the defending force of Surabaja. She laid mines in Madura Strait, near Tuban and near Rembang.

On 2 February (some sources say 1 February), the Japanese W-7-class minesweeper W-9 struck a mine laid by the Gouden Leeuw in Ambon Bay and sank. Two other Japanese minesweepers were also damaged by mines.

On 7 March 1942 she was scuttled by her own crew near Surabaja to prevent being captured by Japanese forces.

Sources
 

Minelayers of the Royal Netherlands Navy